Harry William Harvey Sr. (January 10, 1901 – November 27, 1985) was an American actor of theatre, film, and television. He was the father of actor, script supervisor, and director Harry William Harvey Jr. He is best known for his performances on The Roy Rogers Show (1951-1957), and The Lone Ranger (1949).

Career
Born in Indian Territory, now Oklahoma, Harvey appeared in minstrel shows, in vaudeville, and on the Broadway stage but is best remembered as a character actor who appeared in more than three hundred films and episodes of television series. He co-starred in The Oregon Trail (1936), with John Wayne, Old Overland Trail (1953), Wyoming Renegades (1954), Ride Beyond Vengeance (1966) with Chuck Connors, and many other westerns.

Harvey was cast from 1951 to 1957 in the role of Sheriff Tom Blodgett in fifty-three episodes of The Roy Rogers Show. In 1956 he appeared uncredited as the Marshal on the TV western Cheyenne in the episode "The Last Train West." That same year he appeared as Tom Lovelace in another Cheyenne episode titled "Johnny Bravo."

He played Mayor George Dixon of fictitious Yellowstone in twenty-one episodes from 1957 to 1959 of the syndicated western series, Man Without a Gun. He was cast in different roles in eleven episodes of The Lone Ranger from 1949 to 1955. In 1960 Harvey appeared as Citizen on the TV western Laramie in the episode titled "Duel at Parkinson Town." 

In 1962, he appeared on the short-lived NBC drama series, It's a Man's World as the recurring character, Houghton Stott, owner of Stott's Service Station.

In the 1950s, 1960s, and 1970s, he guest-starred in such series as Branded, Lassie, Hazel, Kentucky Jones, Gunsmoke,
The Wild Wild West, Mannix, Alias Smith and Jones, Bonanza, and Columbo. His last appearance was in an episode of Adam-12 (1974).

Selected filmography

1932: Destry Rides Again
1935: Manhattan Moon
1935: Skybound 
1936: The Oregon Trail
1936: Ticket to Paradise
1936: Headline Crasher
1936: The Reckless Way
 1937: Special Agent K-7
1937: High Hat
1938: Here's Flash Casey
1938: King of the Sierras
1938: Six Shootin' Sheriff
1939: Lone Star Pioneers
1939: Mercy Plane
1939: Two Gun Troubador
1940: Phantom Rancher
1940: Texas Renegades
1940: Deadwood Dick
1940: Ridin' the Trail
1942: The Pride of the Yankees
1943: Return of the Rangers
1944: Gangsters of the Frontier
1946: Step by Step 
1946: Badman's Territory
1947: Trail Street
1948: The Arizona Ranger
1948: They Live by Night
1949: Death Valley Gunfighter
1949: I Cheated the Law
1950: Cow Town
1950: Unmasked
1951: Whirlwind
1951: The Roy Rogers Show -TV series
1951: Arizona Manhunt
1952: High Noon - Coy (uncredited)
1952: The Duel at Silver Creek
1952: Ma and Pa Kettle at the Fair (uncredited)
1953: Old Overland Trail
1957: Man Without a Gun -TV series
1960: Laramie -TV series (episode: "Duel at Parkinson Town")
1962: Lawman -TV series (episode "The Actor") as Dr. Wilson 
1962: It's a Man's World  -TV series
1963: Leave it to Beaver (episode: "Summer in Alaska," as Captain Drake)
1964: Disneyland
1965: Cat Ballou
1965: Kentucky Jones- TV series  (episode: "Senior Citizen", as Uncle Henry)
1965: Gunsmoke- TV series  (episode: "Breckinridge", as Old Man - S10E25)
1966: Ride Beyond Vengeance
1966: Petticoat Junction - TV series  (episode: Better Never Than Late, as Mr. Billings)
1968: Bewitched (TV Series) - Uncle Willie
1969: The Ballad of Andy Crocker (TV Movie) - Mr. Kirkaby
1970: Airport - Dr. Avery Smith - Passenger (uncredited)
1974: Adam-12 (TV Series) - Reverend Harvey

References

Sources
King of the Cowboys, Queen of the West: Roy Rogers and Dale Evans, by Raymond E. White, A Ray and Pat Browne Book,  Popular Press 3; 1st edition (July 17, 2006); /

External links

1901 births
1985 deaths
American male television actors
Male Western (genre) film actors
American male stage actors
20th-century American male actors
Male actors from Oklahoma
People from Sylmar, Los Angeles
Male actors from Los Angeles
Western (genre) television actors